Hong Kong Association of Athletics Affiliates Limited is the sports governing body for the sport of athletics in Hong Kong, a special administrative region of China.

It is the Hong Kong affiliate of World Athletics and the Asian Athletics Association.

See also 
 Sports Federation and Olympic Committee of Hong Kong, China

External links
Official website
 
 

Hong Kong
Athletics
Athletics in Hong Kong
National governing bodies for athletics